The Vermont Catamounts women's ice hockey program represented the University of Vermont in the Women's Hockey East Association during the 2021–22 NCAA Division I women's ice hockey season.

Offseason

Recruiting

Departures

Regular season

Standings

Schedule 

Source:
|-
!colspan=12 style="  "| Regular Season
|-

|-
!colspan=12 style="  "| Hockey East Tournament
|-

Roster

Awards and honors 

 Kristina Shanahan, Hockey East Second Team All-Star
 Jessie McPherson, Hockey East All-Star Honorable Mention
 Reagan Miller, Hockey East All-Rookie Team
 Alyssa Holmes, Hockey East Best Defensive Forward Award
 Maude Poulin-Labelle, Hockey East First Team All-Star
 Maude Poulin-Labelle, Hockey East Best Defenseman Award
 Theresa Schafzahl, Hockey East First Team All-Star
 Theresa Schafzahl, Hockey East Scoring Champion
 Theresa Schafzahl, PNC Bank Three Stars Award
 Theresa Schafzahl, Cammi Granato Hockey East Player of the Year
 Jim Plumer, Hockey East Coach of the Year

Patty Kazmaier Award 

 Theresa Schafzahl, Top 10 Finalist

Division I CCM/AHCA All-Americans 

 Theresa Schafzahl, First Team
 Maude Poulin-Labelle, Second Team

All-USCHO Teams 

 Theresa Schafzahl, Second Team

References

Vermont Catamounts
Vermont Catamounts women's ice hockey seasons